The Office of the Valuer-General is a Schedule 3(A)  public entity of the Ministry of Agriculture, Land Reform and Rural Development established through the Property Valuation Act No. 17 of 2014 (PVA), which came into effect on 01 August 2015.  The OVG was listed by the Minister of Finance, as a Schedule 3(A) public entity in terms of the Public Finance Management Act during the 2017/18 financial year.

The purpose of the entity is to support the program of Land Reform through a provision of property valuation services. The Accounting Authority of the entity is the Valuer-General, a position currently held in an acting capacity by Motlatso Maloka. The Valuer-General is supported by an executive management team. 

In the 2020 budget the entity received an appropriation of R144,1 million.

Related agencies 
 Ministry of Agriculture, Land Reform and Rural Development
 South African Council for the Property Valuers Profession

References

External links 
 

Agriculture, Land Reform and Rural Development
Agricultural organisations based in South Africa
South Africa
South Africa
Rural development in Africa
Valuers general